Gilanduz (also Romanized as Gīlāndūz; also known as Gelandūz and Kilandus) is a village in Zarjabad Rural District, Firuz District, Kowsar County, Ardabil Province, Iran. At the 2006 census, its population was 168, in 30 families.

References 

Tageo

Towns and villages in Kowsar County